Mia Krisna Pratiwi (born 19 June 1996) is an Indonesian Environmental engineer and environmentalist. In 2021, she was listed as one of BBC's 100 Women.

Pratiwi attended the Bandung Institute of Technology and works at the Denpasar City Environmental Agency. Pratiwi developed a computer application to improve the collection, processing and recycling of urban waste on the island of Bali. It is managed through the NGO Griya Luhu and involves the local community.

In October 2021, Pratiwi was on the jury for the Sustainable Teenpreneur Competition.

References 

1996 births
Living people
People from Bali
Environmental engineers
Indonesian engineers
Indonesian women environmentalists
BBC 100 Women
21st-century Indonesian women
Bandung Institute of Technology alumni